Cladomphalus is a genus of diatoms of uncertain affinity.

References

External links 
 

 
 Cladomphalus at WoRMS
 Cladomphalus at diatombase.org

Diatom genera
Bacillariophyceae